The Stonehenge road tunnel is a planned tunnel in Wiltshire, England, drawn up by National Highways to upgrade the A303 road.  It would move the A303 into a tunnel under the Stonehenge World Heritage Site, completing the removal of traffic begun with the 2012 closure of the A344 road. The wider project was designed to improve the landscape around the monument and to improve safety on the A303, and was part of proposals to change the site in other ways including moving the visitors' centre. In 2020, the project was expected to cost £1.7 billion.

Context

The A303 primary route is one of the main routes from London to the South West of England.  Sections have been upgraded to dual carriageway status, though one third of the road remains single carriageway.  Traffic flows on the A303 between Amesbury and Winterbourne Stoke (the section including Stonehenge) are above the capacity of the road and the Highways Agency expressed concern about safety on this road and the A344. 

The two roads passed close to Stonehenge and land owned by the National Trust with the A303 passing directly south and the A344 directly to the north, with a pedestrian tunnel passing from the Stonehenge visitor centre to the site underneath this road.  As part of the development of the proposals, over 50 routes were considered by the Highways Agency.

Since 1991, 51 proposals have been considered for improving the A303 in the area and to remove it from the Stonehenge site.

Proposal 
As of November 2020, the approved planning application comprises:

 A bypass taking the A303 north of the village of Winterbourne Stoke, with a viaduct over the Till valley
 A new junction between the A303 and the A360 Devizes-Salisbury road, west of the existing junction and outside the Stonehenge World Heritage Site
 Expanding the junction between the A303 and A345 near Amesbury.

History

1995 proposal
In 1995 it was proposed to build a tunnel for the A303 underneath the World Heritage Site. A conference agreed on a 2.5-mile (4 km) bored tunnel; however, the government instead proposed a cut and cover tunnel, with plans being published in 1999. These plans were criticised by the National Trust, Transport 2000 and others who expressed concern that it would cause damage to archaeological remains along the route, destroy ancient sites and not achieve an improvement in the landscape.

In 2002, new plans for a bored tunnel of 1.3 miles (2.1 km) were announced by the Secretary of State for Transport as part of a 7.7-mile (12.5 km) plan to upgrade the A303 to dual carriageway status, with the tunnel estimated to cost £183 million. This proposal brought further protests from the National Trust, English Heritage, UNESCO, CPRE, the Council for British Archaeology and local groups as the tunnel approach cutting would cut in two a prehistoric track way between Stonehenge and a nearby river. These groups are calling for a tunnel at least 2.9 km long, which would, while being sited within the world heritage site, clear most of the known major artefacts, claiming that if the government goes ahead with the 2.1 km tunnel there may never be another chance to remove the road from the site completely.

In 2004 a public enquiry required under the Highways Act 1980 was conducted by a planning inspector, Michael Ellison.  His enquiry agreed that the government proposals were adequate. The report stated:

but concluded:

On 20 July 2005 the tunnel scheme was withdrawn by the Government, partly due to rising costs of construction, which had doubled to £470 million. The Highways Agency continued to list the project as planned, but gave 2008 as the earliest date for the start of construction.

2005 proposal
On 31 October 2005 a Government steering group was set up to look at possible solutions, with the aim of choosing an "option in keeping with the special requirements of the location that is affordable, realistic and deliverable." The review presented five options – the published tunnel scheme, a cut and cover tunnel, a 'partial solution' (involving a roundabout but maintaining the current road), and two overland bypass routes. Some of these plans have been criticised as being damaging to both archaeology and biodiversity, including the stone curlew, barn owls, bats, and the chalk grassland habitat. Five options were considered including diverting the A303 further away and only closing the A344. The group expected to produce a report in 2006, taking into account the results of public consultation which started on 23 January 2006 and ran until 24 April 2006.

On 6 December 2007, Roads Minister Tom Harris announced that the whole scheme had been cancelled due to increased costs of £540 million.  English Heritage expressed disappointment whilst the group Save Stonehenge (now Stonehenge Alliance) were pleased with the outcome. The Highways Agency stated that they would continue to work on small scale improvements to the A303.

A344 closure
A revised proposal, of closing the A344 road between Stonehenge Bottom and Byway 12, and closing part of the B3086, was put forward in 2010. This also proposed a new roundabout to replace the Airman's Corner junction and improvements to the Longbarrow roundabout on the A303.

A planning inquiry to consider the proposal began in June 2011. In July 2012 work began on the £27 million project, which involved the closure and grassing over of part of the A344 and the closing of the underpass beneath the road at the monument entrance. In December 2013 the new visitors' centre at Airman's Corner on the A360 was opened. Shuttle buses take visitors to the monument along the old A344 road, a distance of approximately 2.4 km.

2013 proposal
According to documentation released in response to a Freedom of Information request, in January 2012 local councils and the South West Local Enterprise Partnership met to discuss their proposals for "a consortium of Local Authorities to develop and take forward a new scheme for improvements to the A303/ A358/A30" and to "develop an effective lobbying framework so that we can take a planned approach to raising our profile both nationally, regionally and locally". In September 2012 a survey conducted by Somerset County Council found that more than 90% of commuters and businesses in the South West backed an upgrade of the A303. In April 2013 it was reported that the chancellor was giving consideration to "...adding lanes to the A303 – known all too well to holidaymakers – which runs from Basingstoke through Wiltshire (past Stonehenge) and Somerset to the South West of England".

2017 go-ahead
The proposal was given an initial go-ahead by the government on 12 January 2017. The Transport Secretary, Chris Grayling, said that "it will transform the A303, cutting congestion and improving journey times". Chairman of Amesbury Museum and Heritage Trust, Andy Rhind-Tutt, described the tunnel plan as a "self-destructing time bomb" which would "do nothing" for traffic problems in the area. The Stonehenge Alliance campaign group repeated their belief that "any tunnel shorter than 2.7 miles would cause irreparable damage to the landscape". The group also responded with a statement:

Both tunnel portals will lie within the heritage site, and campaigners are concerned that artefacts will be lost during construction. In 2017, a report from UNESCO stated that the tunnel could have an adverse impact on the site, and in 2019 it condemned the project.

Highways England held consultations on the scheme in 2018. A cost of £1.6 billion and a planned start date in 2021 were indicated. English Heritage, the National Trust and Historic England are quoted as supporting the concept of the tunnel with some concerns about the linking of byways, whilst the Stonehenge Alliance and Friends of the Earth remain opposed, as are the Campaign for Better Transport. In July 2019, UNESCO renewed its condemnation of the proposal and urged the government to not approve the scheme.

2020 approval
In 2020, Chancellor Rishi Sunak greenlighted the tunnel project, although this was delayed due to archaeological discoveries at Durrington Walls. The Stonehenge Alliance asserted that this will cause irreparable damage in breach of the World Heritage Convention.

On 12 November 2020, the Secretary of State Grant Shapps granted a Development Consent Order for the project, overruling the recommendation of planning inspectors, and despite widespread opposition and petitions. Campaigners launched a legal challenge.

A "mass trespass" in opposition to the plans was held on 5 December 2020 by an alliance of local people and groups, climate activists, and archaeologists.

2021 legal challenge 
In February 2021, campaigners were granted a High Court hearing to determine if a judicial review should be held, and this was upheld.

On 30 July 2021 with the High Court hearing taking place, UNESCO re-iterated that Stonehenge and other sites in the UK could lose their World Heritage status if the UK Government did not curb "ill-advised development". Campaigners opposing the tunnel were successful in the hearing, with the judge ruling the Transport Secretary's decision to proceed with the tunnel as being "unlawful" on two grounds: that there was no evidence of the impact on each individual asset at the site, and that he had failed to consider alternative schemes.

In June 2022, the Department for Transport and National Highways (the new name for Highways England since 2021) were still investigating whether alternative routes had been properly considered.

Contractors 
In May 2022, National Highways named an international consortium as its preferred bidder for construction of the tunnel and associated roads; the consortium is a joint venture of FCC Construcción (Spain), WeBuild (Italy) and BeMo Tunnelling (Austria). The following month, National Highways contracted with Mace for quantity surveying, cost consultancy and contractor liaison on the whole scheme, covering the road improvements as well as the tunnel.

See also 
 List of road projects in the UK

References

External links
 Highways England: A303 Amesbury to Berwick Down (Stonehenge) – official project website
 National Infrastructure Planning: A303 Stonehenge – Planning Inspectorate
 Stonehenge Alliance campaign group
 2004 planning enquiry – archived June 2006
 Council for British Archaeology’s Stonehenge/A303 timeline, 2010 – archived February 2016
 'Our Plans for Stonehenge: English Heritage – archived August 2011
 The National Trust's proposals for Stonehenge, December 2014
 Stonehenge: Celebration and Subversion, Andy Worthington

Stonehenge
Transport in Wiltshire
Roads in England
Proposed road tunnels in Europe
Proposed roads in the United Kingdom